Jaimy Gordon (born July 4, 1944) is an American writer.  She is a winner of the National Book Award for Fiction.

Biography
She was born in Baltimore. She graduated from Antioch College in 1966, received an MA in English from Brown University in 1972, and earned a Doctor of Arts in Creative Writing in 1975, also from Brown. She currently lives in Kalamazoo, Michigan, where she previously taught in the MFA and PhD program of Western Michigan University.

Work
Gordon is considered to be an important writer, whose literary works have been recognized and highlighted at Michigan State University in their Michigan Writers Series. She is author of the underground fantasy classic Shamp of the City-Solo.

Awards
Her fourth novel, Lord of Misrule, published by McPherson & Co., won the 2010 National Book Award for Fiction. She was named 2019 Michigan Author Award Winner, a lifetime achievement award conferred by the Michigan Library Association.

Works
 Shamp of the City-Solo (Treacle Press, 1974)
 The Rose of the West (Woodbine Press, 1976)
 The Bend, The Lip, The Kid (Sun Press, 1978)
 Private T. Pigeon's Tale (Treacle Press, 1979)
 Circumspections from an Equestrian Statue (Burning Deck, 1979)
 She Drove Without Stopping (Algonquin Books of Chapel Hill, 1990)
 Bogeywoman (Sun & Moon Press, 1999)
 Lord of Misrule (McPherson & Company, 2010)

References

Sources
Gargoyle Magazine: An Interview with Jaimy Gordon

External links 
 WMU Press Release
 Jaimy Gordon Faculty Page
 2010 National Book Award Finalist, Fiction
 Western Michigan University professor Jaimy Gordon named National Book Award finalist
 2011 radio interview at The Bat Segundo Show
 A Surprise Nomination, a Publisher's Quandary

American women writers
Antioch College alumni
Brown University alumni
National Book Award winners
Western Michigan University faculty
Living people
1944 births
Writers from Baltimore
PEN/Faulkner Award for Fiction winners
American women academics
21st-century American women